Bill Thiebaut is an attorney and politician from Pueblo, Colorado. He was elected to four two-year terms in the Colorado House of Representatives, serving from 1987 to 1993, when he was appointed to the Colorado Senate to fill a vacancy following the resignation of Larry E. Trujillo. Following his appointment to the senate, he was elected and re-elected to the senate in 1994 and 1998. In the senate, he served as majority leader in the 2001-2002 session. 

In 2002, Thiebaut was a candidate for lieutenant governor of Colorado, running with gubernatorial candidate Rollie Heath. In the general election, Bill Owens and Jane Norton defeated Heath and Thiebaut.

Following his service as a legislator, Thiebaut was elected district attorney of Colorado's Tenth Judicial District, which comprises Pueblo County, for two four-year terms, holding the office from January 2005 to January 2013.

Prior to serving in elected office, Thiebaut served as the public trustee of Pueblo County from  1979 to 1986. After leaving the DA's office, Thiebaut has continued to serve on various committees, including the eleven-member State Transportation Commission, which he chaired.

Personal life
Thiebaut was born in 1947 in Santa Fe, New Mexico, but when he was very young, his family moved to Pueblo, where he was raised. He attended high school in Cañon City, Colorado. He and his wife Mary Ann have 15 children.

References

External links
District Attorney campaign website
Thiebaut's campaign history from the Colorado Secretary of State

Democratic Party members of the Colorado House of Representatives
Democratic Party Colorado state senators
District attorneys in Colorado
20th-century American politicians
21st-century American politicians
Living people
People from Pueblo, Colorado
1947 births